José Leonel Silva (born December 19, 1973 in Tijuana, Mexico) is a Mexican former right-handed pitcher. He last played for the Rieleros de Aguascalientes of the Mexican League. He played all or part of six seasons in Major League Baseball with the Toronto Blue Jays in 1996, Pittsburgh Pirates from 1997 until 2001, and the Cincinnati Reds in 2002.

Silva was drafted out of Hilltop High School in Chula Vista, California. He last pitched in the affiliated minor leagues in 2006 for the Oklahoma RedHawks, and has been playing in the Mexican League since then.

References

External links

1973 births
Águilas Cibaeñas players
Mexican expatriate baseball players in the Dominican Republic
Altoona Curve players
Baseball players at the 2007 Pan American Games
Baseball players from Baja California
Calgary Cannons players
Cincinnati Reds players
Diablos Rojos del México players
Dorados de Chihuahua players
Dunedin Blue Jays players
Expatriate baseball players in Taiwan
Gulf Coast Blue Jays players
Hagerstown Suns players
Iowa Cubs players
Knoxville Smokies players
Living people
Louisville Bats players
Major League Baseball pitchers
Major League Baseball players from Mexico
Mexican expatriate baseball players in Canada
Mexican expatriate baseball players in the United States
Mexican League baseball pitchers
Nashville Sounds players
Oklahoma RedHawks players
Olmecas de Tabasco players
Pan American Games bronze medalists for Mexico
Pan American Games medalists in baseball
Piratas de Campeche players
Pittsburgh Pirates players
Portland Beavers players
Rieleros de Aguascalientes players
Sacramento River Cats players
Sportspeople from Chula Vista, California
Sportspeople from Tijuana
Sultanes de Monterrey players
Toronto Blue Jays players
Tucson Sidewinders players
Williamsport Crosscutters players
Medalists at the 2007 Pan American Games